The Taipei Open or Taipei WTA Challenger is a tournament for female professional tennis players played on indoor carpet courts. The event is currently classified as an WTA 125K tournament. It has been held annually in November in Taipei City, Taiwan, from 2008 until 2015, and was sponsored by the OEC Group. In 2012, the event was upgraded from a $100,000 ITF tournament to a WTA Challenger tournament.

History
In 2007, OEC Group Chairman Robert Han organized an ITF tournament in Taoyuan where the prize was $50,000 plus hotel.
OEC has retroactively referred to the event as the 2007 OEC Cup Taiwan Ladies Open.

In October 18–20, 2008, the OEC Group held the 2008 OEC Taipei Ladies Open, which was a WTA-sanctioned ITF $100,000+H Tournament. held at the National Taiwan University Gymnasium and the Taipei Arena. In 2010 and 2011 it was called the OEC Taipei Ladies Open, and it has also been referred to as the Haishuo Cup (海碩盃).

In 2012, the event was upgraded to a WTA 125K series event. It had attracted over 60,000 visitors. In 2013, the tournament was renamed to OEC Taipei WTA Challenger. and has used that name since.

Past finals

Singles 

† – note: not considered the Taipei Open by some sources

Doubles 

† – note: not considered the Taipei Open by some sources

See also
 List of sporting events in Taiwan

References

External links
  
 OEC Taipei WTA Challenger profile at WTATennis.com

 
ITF Women's World Tennis Tour
Carpet court tennis tournaments
Tennis tournaments in Taiwan
Sport in Taipei
Recurring sporting events established in 2007